The 34th Grey Cup was played on November 30, 1946, before 18,960 fans at Varsity Stadium at Toronto.

The Toronto Argonauts defeated the Winnipeg Blue Bombers 28–6.

External links
 
 
 

Grey Cup
Grey Cup
Grey Cups hosted in Toronto
1946 in Ontario
November 1946 sports events in Canada
1940s in Toronto
Toronto Argonauts
Winnipeg Blue Bombers